Buchanan  is a village in the Canadian province of Saskatchewan within the Rural Municipality of Buchanan No. 304 and Census Division No. 9.

History 
Buchanan incorporated as a village on June 11, 1907. The village was named after Robert Buchanan, a local rancher who died in 1919.

Demographics 

Notable people
 Lois Hole (1929–2005), Canadian writer, businesswoman, and politician; 15th Lieutenant Governor of Alberta
 Michel Hrynchyshyn, Ukrainian Catholic bishop

See also
 List of communities in Saskatchewan
 Villages of Saskatchewan

References 

 
Villages in Saskatchewan
Buchanan No. 304, Saskatchewan
Division No. 9, Saskatchewan